Sunamganj Stadium is located by the Sunamganj Jame Masjid & Sunamganj Police Station , Sunamganj, Bangladesh.

See also
Stadiums in Bangladesh
List of cricket grounds in Bangladesh

References

Football venues in Bangladesh